The Rochester Shale is a geologic formation exposed in New York and West Virginia. It preserves fossils dating back to the Silurian period.

See also

 List of fossiliferous stratigraphic units in West Virginia

References

 

Silurian Maryland
Silurian Ohio
Silurian West Virginia
Silurian geology of Virginia
Silurian geology of New York (state)
Silurian south paleopolar deposits